Ankit Siwach is an Indian television actor.

Career
Siwach began his television career in 2017 with the leading role of Inspector Adhiraj Pandey in Star Plus' Rishton Ka Chakravyuh. In 2018, he appeared in a cameo role for Star Plus' Ishqbaaaz and an episodic role for &TV's Laal Ishq.
In November 2018, he has been seen playing Ram/Rana Bhanu Pratap Singh in Zee TV's Manmohini.

In 2020, he portrayed Vikram Jai Singh in Sony TV's Beyhadh 2. As of August 2020, he is Seen as a host in Epic TV Safarnama. In 2021, he playing the role of Vyom in Voot's web series popular Ishq Mein Marjawan 2: Naya Safar. In March 2022, he portrays the main lead Armaan in StarPlus' show Yeh Jhuki Jhuki Si Nazar.

Filmography

Television

Web series

Films 

 Banaras Vanilla

References

External links

Indian male television actors
Living people
Indian male soap opera actors
Male actors in Hindi television
21st-century Indian male actors
Year of birth missing (living people)
People from Meerut